Ken Shirk (Kenneth Ivan Shirk, popularly known as Cowman and Cowman A MooHa) is an ultramarathon runner who in 1976 was the ninth person to complete the course of The Western States Trail Ride on foot.  In 1977 the Western States Endurance Run was officially established on the same course. As of 2006 he also has raced officially and unofficially in every Ironman World Championship except the first one.

The first official Western States Endurance Run was in 1977, but before then a few runners ran with the horses in the Tevis Cup, a 24-hour, 100-mile horse endurance ride. By 1976 nine individuals had completed the course on foot. In 1972 seven soldiers from Fort Riley, Kansas completed Tevis Cup course on foot in less than 48 hours.  Next was Gordy Ainsleigh, who completed it on foot in under 24 hours. Ken was ninth in 1976 with a time of 24:30,

Ken Shirk is known for wearing a helmet sporting fur and large bovine horns.

See also
Cowman (disambiguation)

References

External links
Facebook:  Cowman A MooHa

Year of birth missing (living people)
Living people
American male triathletes
American male ultramarathon runners